

Komitas Park and Pantheon is located in Yerevan's Shengavit District, on the right side of the main Arshakunyats Avenue, in Armenia. It was formed in 1936 after the demolition of the "Mler" cemetery and its historic chapel.

Many outstanding figures of Armenia's artistic world are buried here, including Komitas (1869–1935), the founder of Armenian national music, for whom it is named.

Notable interments

There are 60 burials at the Komitas Panthoen.  Below is the list of some of the more notable burials:

See also
 History of Yerevan
 Armenian Pantheon of Tbilisi

References

External links
 ArmenianPages.com – Komitas Park, the Pantheon of Prominent Art Figures
 Hush.am – Pantheon genealogical website

Armenian cemeteries
Buildings and structures in Yerevan
Cemeteries in Armenia
Tourist attractions in Yerevan
1936 establishments in the Soviet Union
Burials in Armenia